Lake of the Pines is a census-designated place (CDP) and a gated residential community in Nevada County, California, United States. The population was 3,917 at the 2010 census.

History
Lake of the Pines was laid out by property developers in the 1960s.

Geography

Lake of the Pines is commonly associated with a gated residential community which surrounds a reservoir, also named Lake of the Pines.  The reservoir was created by damming Magnolia Creek, in the Bear River watershed, and it has a maximum elevation of 459 m (1507 ft).  The gated community contains a golf course looping around the reservoir.  The community is normally accessed only through the main entrance from Magnolia Road, just northeast of Combie Road.

The boundaries of the census-designated place differ slightly from the boundaries of the gated community.  As the CDP boundaries tend to follow streets, the CDP excludes many parcels in the periphery of the gated community and includes a shopping center in Combie Road.  In postal addresses, the area is considered a part of Auburn, though the city of Auburn is in Placer County.

Demographics

2010

At the 2010 census Lake of the Pines had a population of 3,917. The racial makeup of Lake of the Pines was 3,669 (93.7%) White, 5 (0.1%) African American, 20 (0.5%) Native American, 65 (1.7%) Asian, 7 (0.2%) Pacific Islander, 24 (0.6%) from other races, and 127 (3.2%) from two or more races. Hispanic or Latino of any race were 246 people (6.3%).

The census reported that 3,917 people  lived in households, no one lived in non-institutionalized group quarters and no one was institutionalized.

There were 1,567 households, 478 (30.5%) had children under the age of 18 living in them, 977 (62.3%) were opposite-sex married couples living together, 157 (10.0%) had a female householder with no husband present, 62 (4.0%) had a male householder with no wife present.  There were 54 (3.4%) unmarried opposite-sex partnerships, and 15 (1.0%) same-sex married couples or partnerships. 314 households (20.0%) were one person and 197 (12.6%) had someone living alone who was 65 or older. The average household size was 2.50.  There were 1,196 families (76.3% of households); the average family size was 2.84.

The age distribution was 871 people (22.2%) under the age of 18, 221 people (5.6%) aged 18 to 24, 594 people (15.2%) aged 25 to 44, 1,276 people (32.6%) aged 45 to 64, and 955 people (24.4%) who were 65 or older.  The median age was 49.5 years. For every 100 females, there were 90.4 males.  For every 100 females age 18 and over, there were 87.2 males.

There were 1,768 housing units at an average density of 957.8 per square mile, of the occupied units 1,234 (78.7%) were owner-occupied and 333 (21.3%) were rented. The homeowner vacancy rate was 3.2%; the rental vacancy rate was 2.3%.  2,932 people (74.9% of the population) lived in owner-occupied housing units and 985 people (25.1%) lived in rental housing units.

2000
At the 2000 census there were 3,956 people, 1,554 households, and 1,252 families in the CDP. The racial makeup of the CDP was 96.46% White, 0.15% African American, 0.61% Native American, 0.83% Asian, 0.08% Pacific Islander, 0.73% from other races, and 1.14% from two or more races. Hispanic or Latino of any race were 3.19%.

Of the 1,554 households 28.3% had children under the age of 18 living with them, 72.0% were married couples living together, 6.4% had a female householder with no husband present, and 19.4% were non-families. 16.6% of households were one person and 11.8% were one person aged 65 or older.  The average household size was 2.55 and the average family size was 2.83.

The age distribution was 22.9% under the age of 18, 4.5% from 18 to 24, 18.6% from 25 to 44, 26.7% from 45 to 64, and 27.3% 65 or older.  The median age was 47 years. For every 100 females, there were 97.1 males.  For every 100 females age 18 and over, there were 91.3 males.

The median household income was $52,105 and the median family income  was $55,861. Males had a median income of $46,500 versus $32,155 for females. The per capita income for the CDP was $23,357.  About 4.7% of families and 5.8% of the population were below the poverty line, including 6.1% of those under age 18 and 4.5% of those age 65 or over.

Politics

References

External links 
City website

Census-designated places in Nevada County, California
Gated communities in California
Census-designated places in California